Historia de Un Ídolo, Vol. 1 (Eng.: History of an Idol, Vol. 1) is a compilation album released in 2000 by ranchero music performer Vicente Fernández. This album achieve a rare feat on the Billboard Top Latin Albums chart, it peaked at number-one in 2001 and 2007. , it is the best fifth bestselling Latin album in the United States.

Track listing
This track listing from Billboard.com.
Lástima Que Seas Ajena (Jorge Massias) — 4:16
La Ley del Monte (José A. Espinoza "Ferrusquilla") — 3:24
Aunque Mal Paguen Ellas (Duet with Roberto Carlos) (Federico Méndez) — 3:25
El Hijo del Pueblo (José Alfredo Jiménez) — 2:41
Acá Entre Nos (Martin Urieta) — 3:13
Ni en Defensa Propia (Ramón Ortega Contreras) — 2:24
Que de Raro Tiene (Martin Urieta) — 3:19
Me Voy a Quitar de en Medio (Manuel Monterrosas) — 2:44
Hoy Platiqué Con Mi Gallo (Federico Méndez) — 3:37
Nos Estorbó La Ropa (Teodoro Bello) — 3:02
Palabra de Rey (Antonio Valdés Herrera) — 2:28
Las Llaves de Mi Alma (Vicente Fernández) — 2:56
Por Tu Maldito Amor (Federico Méndez/Vicente Fernández) — 3:56
Mi Viejo (José Piero) — 3:12
La Diferencia (Juan Gabriel) — 2:50
Mujeres Divinas (Martin Urieta) — 3:12
Hermoso Cariño (Fernando Maldonado) — 2:34

Chart performance

Sales and certifications

See also
List of best-selling Latin albums in the United States

References

Vicente Fernández compilation albums
2000 greatest hits albums
Sony Discos compilation albums
Spanish-language compilation albums